"The Song of the Happy Shepherd" is a poem by William Butler Yeats.

It was first published under this title in his first book, The Wanderings of Oisin and Other Poems, but in fact the same poem had appeared twice before: as an epilogue to Yeats' poem The Isle of Statues, and again as an epilogue to his verse play Mosada.  On the first of these occasions, the poem was said to be spoken by a satyr carrying a conch shell.

See also
 1889 in poetry
 List of works by William Butler Yeats

References

 Mosada (William Butler Yeats, 1886) — in its original publication, the play was followed by this lyric.

External links 

 The Song of the Happy Shepherd

Irish poems
Poetry by W. B. Yeats